Magnesium aluminide is an intermetallic compound of magnesium and aluminium. Common phases (molecular structures) include the beta phase (Mg2Al3) and the gamma phase (Mg17Al12), which both have cubic crystal structures. Magnesium aluminides are important constituents of 5XXX aluminium alloys (aluminium-magnesium) and magnesium-aluminium alloys, determining many of their engineering properties. Due to the advantage of low density and being strong, magnesium aluminide is important for aircraft engines. MgAl has also been investigated for use as a reactant to produce metal hydrides in hydrogen storage technology. Like many intermetallics, MgAl compounds often have unusual stoichiometries with large and complex unit cells.

References

 

Alloys
Aluminides
Magnesium compounds